Cordania is an extinct genus of trilobites that lived from the Early to Middle Devonian.

Distribution 
Fossils of Cordania have been found in Australia, China, Morocco and the United States (Oklahoma). Also in the Emsian-Givetian Floresta Formation of the Altiplano Cundiboyacense, Colombia, fossils of Cordania have been found.

References

Bibliography

External links 
 Photo of C. wessmani
 Photos of C. falcata
  Trilobite info

Proetida genera
Devonian trilobites of North America
Silurian United States
Devonian United States
Devonian animals of Africa
Fossils of Morocco
Devonian trilobites of South America
Devonian Colombia
Fossils of Colombia
Devonian trilobites of Asia
Fossils of China
Trilobites of Australia
Fossil taxa described in 1892
Floresta Formation